Hub Industrial and Trading Estate, often shortened as HITE, is an industrial estate located in Hub, Balochistan, Pakistan.

It was established in 1982 as a tax-free industrial estate.

Lasbela Industrial Estates Development Authority 
In Hub, there are 150 functional industries which are regulated and looked after by the Lasbela Industrial Estate and Development Authority (LIEDA).

See also 

 Hub Dam
 Hub Tehsil
 Hub Industrial & Trading Estate
 Hub River
 Hub District

References

Economy of Balochistan, Pakistan
Industrial parks in Pakistan